Benoît Brisefer (French for "Benedict Ironbreaker", published as "Benny Breakiron" in English, Dutch: Steven Sterk) is a Belgian comic strip created in 1960 by Peyo (best known for the Smurfs) and published by Le Lombard, about a little boy whose peaceful, innocent appearance, charm and good manners covers his possession of superhuman strength. Since Peyo's death it has been continued by other artists and writers. Parts of the series have been published in a number of languages around the world.

Publication history
Benoît Brisefer first appeared in issue 1183 of Spirou magazine in mid-December 1960. His adventures were regularly published in both the magazine and in book form. As well as Peyo himself, other contributors to the series included leading figures in the Belgian comics industry, such as Will, Jean Roba (who drew some of the covers when the series was published in Spirou), Gos, Yvan Delporte, François Walthéry and Albert Blesteau, many of whom were part of Peyo's studio.

It initially lasted till 1978 when the success of the Smurfs prevented Peyo from working on his other series. Since his death in 1992, it has been restarted by his son Thierry Culliford and artist Pascal Garray. Peyo's signature still appears on the pages drawn by Garray.

In 1967, the British comic Giggle published Benoît's first adventure, giving him the name Tammy Tuff. Other English-language publications have used the name Steven Strong and  Benny Breakiron.

Main character
Benoît Brisefer is a blond-haired little boy who always wears a beret, a blue scarf, a red jacket and black shorts. He is polite, honest and well-mannered, pays attention at school (he often quotes his teacher's life advice) and likes to help people in need. He hates crime and injustice and has an intense dislike of firearms.

What makes him exceptional, though, are his physical abilities, which are vastly enhanced versions of normal human abilities (he has no supernatural abilities such as flight or projecting energy): vast superhuman strength (in Les Douze Travaux de Benoît Brisefer, he proved capable of effortlessly lifting an elephant or tearing a large safe door), incredible leaping and great speed. He occasionally demonstrated other abilities such as super-breath not unlike Superman's (in Les Douze Travaux de Benoît Brisefer, he used it once to extinguish a fire). He also seems to possess some degree of invulnerability (in Les Douze Travaux de Benoît Brisefer again, he fell from a flying plane and landed roughly on the ground by punching a hole in it, but he was unharmed). However, his weakness is the cold; if he catches it, he loses his strength and becomes merely a "well-behaved little boy that every parent would love to have."

Benoît lives in the small town of Vivejoie-la-Grande (French for "Big-Lovejoy"). No mention is ever made of him having parents or guardians of any kind. The only such reference was in Le Cirque Bodoni where Choesels, wanting to attract publicity and interest, told the journalists that Benoît belonged in a family of a Turk father and a Gypsy mother, one of 10 children. His last Peyo-written adventure, Le Fétiche, showed that a lady called Madam Minou took care of his house and served him his breakfast, but lives in another part of town. Other than that, his only known relative is his uncle Tonton Placide whom he sometimes stays with during the holidays.

A running gag in the strip is that Benoît's adult acquaintances are completely ignorant of his abilities: they are always absent or incapacitated when Benoît uses his strength, which he generally keeps secret. Whenever he tries to confide his secret with them, their response is bemused disbelief and "Of course, Benoît, of course." The few times he tries to demonstrate his strength, he catches a cold. The witnesses of his power are the villains, always after they have been warned and failed to believe him. They usually all end up lying in a heap, knocked unconscious by Benoît.

A recurring joke is Benoît's inability to narrate and explain events clearly when in haste or excited, as whenever he tries to warn the police. He talks excessively mixing his words, names and events, and ends up befuddling and confusing the adults. As a result, he is never taken seriously, even if later he is proven right.

Another recurring joke is how Benoît, in his childhood innocence, links his larger-than-life experiences to basic morals taught in school. For example, after uprooting a tree to save a stranded cat, he returns it to its previous position because "The schoolmistress says so". When attacked by criminals he tries to conform them by saying "The schoolmistress always says that you should not attack people who are smaller than yourself". The frequently-mentioned schoolmistress is not seen until Le Fétiche where her name is revealed to be "Mlle Tapotrin".

A frequent gag is Benoît's inability to control his strength, perceived by others as clumsiness. After each blunder, Benoît says to himself "What have I done again?". This makes it difficult for Benoît to play with other kids as he unintentionally breaks their toys: simply kicking a ball would cause it to burst. In later stories he is less clumsy, making friends and he and other children enjoy a good time at summer camp.

Supporting characters

 Jules Dussiflard: a former jazz musician, now the driver of an old inter-war taxi.

Serge Vladlavodka: an inventor who has devised a number of mechanical creations, including robots. Among other things, Vladlavodka was the creator of Madame Adolphine II.

Madame Adolphine: a charming little old lady, who is quite harmless and always offering sweets to passing acquaintances. She was the model for the robotic Madame Adolphine II.

Madame Adolphine II aka Lady d'Olphine: a robot created by Vladlavodka. He based her design on the (real-life) concept of the turtle robots devised by William Grey Walter but also made her more sentient. He also built her to look like a local lady, Mrs Adolphine, since the thick clothes she wore would cover the mechanics and the appearance of an old woman would explain her slowness. However, Vladlavodka once got two of her circuits mixed up and as a result she became evil: holding up people at gunpoint, robbing banks and even becoming a crime lord under the name "Lady d'Olphine". Although not strong enough to battle Benoît, she is cunning and manipulative and has often tricked the good-natured little boy into unintentionally helping her in her plans.

The chief of police: of the town where Benoît lives. Benoît often goes to see him to warn of the crimes that he has witnessed, but his tendency to talk excessively when excited and mixing up his words tries the chief's patience and he sends him packing — leaving Benoît to deal with the crooks himself. The chief also dismisses his claims on the grounds that kids like him read too many comics — before going into his office and reading some comics himself.

Uncle Placid: the nearest Benoît appears to have to a relative, Uncle Placid is a large, powerfully-built man with a big heart to go with it. He is a police bodyguard who protects visiting foreign officials and celebrities. He is an expert marksman and can more than hold his own in a fight against multiple opponents (though he lacks his nephew's superhuman strength — of which he is unaware of in spite of Benoît's numerous attempts to show him).

Media adaptations
In 2014 the comic strip was adapted into a live-action film, Benoît Brisefer - Les Taxis Rouges.

In popular culture
In the Hoogstraat/Rue Haute in Brussels a comic book wall is dedicated to the character. The fresco was designed by the artistic ensemble Urbana.

Stories
Below is a list of the French titles of Benoît Brisefer's adventures, their year of publication, an English translation of the titles and a brief description. They are listed in order of publication.

See also
The Mort & Phil comic El plano de Alí-Gusa-No, which shares a similar plot with Les Douze travaux de Benoît Brisefer.

References

External links
Benoît Brisefer entry at Internationalhero.com 
French fansite 
Benoît Brisefer books at Bedetheque.com 

1960 comics debuts
Brisefer, Benoît
Dupuis titles
Lombard Editions titles
Brisefer, Benoît
Comics by Peyo
Humor comics
Adventure comics
Belgian comic strips
Brisefer, Benoît
Brisefer, Benoît
Brisefer, Benoît
Brisefer, Benoît
Brisefer, Benoît
Brisefer, Benoît
Belgian comics adapted into films